The 2008–09 Liga I was the ninety-first season of Liga I, the top-level football league of Romania. Season began on 26 July 2008 and ended on 10 June 2009. CFR Cluj were the defending champions.

Teams

Promoted
Teams promoted from Liga II at the beginning of the season.
 Serie 1 Champions: Brașov
 Serie 2 Champions: Argeș Pitești
 Serie 1 Runners-up: Otopeni
 Serie 2 Runners-up: Gaz Metan Mediaș

Relegated
Teams relegated to Liga II at the end of season.
 Argeș Pitești
 Farul Constanța
 Otopeni
 Gloria Buzău

Venues

Personnel and kits

Managerial changes

League table

Positions by round

Results

Top goalscorers

Source: Liga1.ro

Champion squad

Season statistics

Scoring
 First goal of the season: Andrei Prepeliță for Craiova against Iași, 64 minutes (Round 1 – 26 July 2008)
 Last goal of the season: Claudiu Niculescu for Dinamo against Argeș, 90+3 minutes (Round 34 – 10 June 2009)
 Fastest goal in a match: Andrei Cristea for Iași against Pandurii, 10 seconds (Round 30 – 9 May 2009)
 Fastest two goals in a match: Pandurii 1–1 Bistrița, minutes 2 and 4 seconds (Round 14 – 8 November 2008)
 Goal scored at the latest point in a match: Cristian Oroș for Brașov against Unirea, 90+4 minutes (Round 1 – 26 July 2008)
 First own goal of the season: Zhivko Zhelev (Oțelul) for Gaz Metan, 31 minutes (Round 1 – 27 July 2008)
 Two own goals by the same team in a match: Diogo and Alexandru Tudose (both Buzău) for CFR, minutes 14 and 79 (Round 2 – 3 August 2008)
 Two goals in one minute and one second: Farul 1–1 Brașov, between 5:53 and 6:54 (Round 13 – 1 November 2008)
 Three goals in three minutes: Farul 1–4 Steaua, minutes 89, 90 and 90+2 (Round 7 – 13 September 2008)
 Six goals in 30 minutes: Gaz Metan 5–1 Timișoara, minutes 60 through 90 (Round 3 – 9 August 2008)
 Most goals in one half: Gaz Metan 0–0 at half time, 5–1 final Timișoara (Round 3 – 9 August 2008)
 Widest winning margin: Otopeni 6–0 Farul (Round 34 – 10 June 2009)
 Hattricks scored: 4
 Alexandru Curtean for Gaz Metan against Timișoara, minutes 65, 75 and 81 (Round 3 – 9 August 2008)
 Marius Niculae for Dinamo against Vaslui, minutes 24, 78 and 90 (Round 24 – 11 April 2009)
 Marius Niculae for Dinamo against Bistrița, minutes 20, 56 and 72 (Round 26 – 21 April 2009)
 Victoraș Iacob for Otopeni against Farul, minutes 4, 34 and 50 (Round 34 – 10 June 2009)

Cards
 First yellow card: Attila Hadnagy for Brașov against Unirea, 19 minutes (Round 1 – 26 July 2008)
 First red card: Rafael Pereira for Gaz Metan against Dinamo, 22 minutes (Round 2 – 3 August 2008)
 Most red cards in a single match: 3
 Dinamo 1–0 Craiova – 2 for Dinamo (Júlio César, Adrian Ropotan) and 1 for Craiova (Josh Mitchell) (Round 6 – 30 August 2008)
 Argeș 1–1 Craiova – 2 for Craiova (Mircea Bornescu, Michael Baird) and 1 for Argeș (Daniel Bălașa) (Round 10 – 3 October 2008)
 Match without any cards: Unirea 1–1 Steaua (Round 34 – 10 June 2009)

References

Liga I seasons
Romania
1